Imre is a Hungarian masculine first name, which is also in Estonian use, where the corresponding name day is 10 April. It has been suggested that it relates to the name Emeric, Emmerich or Heinrich. Its English equivalents are Emery and Henry.

Bearers of the name include the following (who generally held Hungarian nationality, unless otherwise noted):

Imre Antal (1935–2008), pianist
Imre Bajor (1957–2014), actor
Imre Bebek (d. 1395), baron
Imre Bródy (1891–1944), physicist
Imre Bujdosó (b. 1959), Olympic fencer
Imre Csáky (cardinal) (1672–1732), Roman Catholic cardinal
Imre Csermelyi (b. 1988), football player
Imre Cseszneky (1804–1874), agriculturist and patriot
Imre Csiszár (b. 1938), mathematician
Imre Csösz (b. 1969), Olympic judoka
Imre Czobor (1520–1581), Noble and statesman
Imre Czomba (b. 1972), Composer and musician
Imre Deme (b. 1983), football player
Imre Erdődy (1889–1973), Olympic gymnast
Imre Farkas (1879–1976), musician
Imre Farkas (1935–2020), Olympic canoeist
Imre Finta (1911–2003), indicted war criminal
Imre Földi (1938–2017), Olympic weightlifter
Imre Friedmann (1921–2007), biologist
Imre Frivaldszky (1799–1870), botanist and entomologist
Imre Garaba (b. 1958), football player
Imre Gedővári (1951–2014), Olympic fencer
Imre Gellért (1888–1981), Olympic gymnast
Imre Gyöngyössy (1930–1994), film director and screenwriter
Imre Harangi (1913–1979), Olympic boxer
Imre Hódos (1928–1989), Olympic wrestler
Imre Hollai (1925–2017), diplomat, President of the United Nations General Assembly
Imre Jenei (b. 1937), Romanian (Hungarian ethnic) football player and coach
Imre Kálmán (1882–1953), operetta composer
Imre Kertész (1929–2016), author and winner of the 2002 Nobel Prize in Literature
Imre König (1899–1992), chess master
Imre Komora (b. 1940), football player
Imre Lakatos (1922–1974), philosopher of mathematics and science
Imre Leader (b. 1963), British mathematician
Imre Madách (1823–1864), writer, poet, lawyer and politician
Imre Makovecz (1935–2011), architect
Imre Mándi (1916–1945), Olympic boxer
Imre Mikó (1805–1876), Statesman, politician, economist, historian and patron from Transylvania, who served as Minister of Public Works and Transport of Hungary between 1867 and 1870
Imre Mudin (1887–1918), Olympic track and field athlete
Imre Nagy (1896–1958), politician, twice Prime Minister of Hungary, key figure of the Hungarian Revolution of 1956
Imre Nagy (b. 1933), Olympic pentathlete
Imre Németh (1917–1989), Olympic hammer thrower
Imre of Hungary (c. 1007–1031), prince and Roman Catholic saint
Imre of Hungary (1174–1204), King of Hungary
Imre Páli (1909–?), Olympic handballer
Imre Polyák (1932–2010), Olympic wrestler
Imre Pozsgay (1933–2016), reform Communist politician
Imre Pulai (b. 1967), Olympic canoer
Imre Rapp (1937–2015), football player
Imre Salusinszky (b. 1955), Australian newspaper columnist
Imre Schlosser (1889–1959), football player
Imre Senkey (1898–?), football player and manager
Imre Sooäär (born 1969), Estonian politician 
Imre Steindl (1839–1902), architect
Imre Szabics (b. 1981), football player
Imre Szekeres (b. 1950), politician and Minister of Defence
Imre Szellő (b. 1983), Olympic boxer
Imre Szentpály (1904–1987), Olympic polo player
Imre Taussig (1894–1945), Hungarian footballer 
Imre Taveter (born 1967), Estonian sport sailor
Imre Thököly (1657–1705), statesman, leader of an anti-Habsburg uprising, Prince of Transylvania
Imre Tiidemann (b. 1970), Estonian modern pentathlete
Imre Tiitsu (b. 1980), Estonian ice sledge hockey player
Imre Tóth (b. 1985), Grand Prix motorcycle racer
Imre Varadi (b. 1959), English football player
Imre Weisshaus (1905–1987), Hungarian-French pianist
Imre Zachár (1890–1954), Olympic water polo player and swimmer
Imre Zámbó (1958–2001), pop singer by the name of Jimmy Zámbó

See also
 Imre (surname)
 Americus (disambiguation)
 Emre
 Haimirich

References

Hungarian masculine given names
Estonian masculine given names